World of Sport can refer to:

World of Sport (Australian TV program) seen on Melbourne's HSV Channel 7
World of Sport (Sydney, Australia TV series) seen on Sydney's TCN Channel 9
World of Sport (UK TV programme), a 1965–1985 British television sport programme broadcast nationwide on ITV
Johnny Vaughan's World of Sport - a short lived revival of the ITV programme on digital channel BBC Three, hosted by Johnny Vaughan.
World of Sport Wrestling, promoted as a 2018 reboot of the wrestling segment of the original UK television series, a UK wrestling promotion and television series broadcast on ITV
"World of Sport" style - a retronym for the "Traditional"/"Old School" style of Professional wrestling in the United Kingdom, derived from digital TV repeats of the original segment.
Trevor's World of Sport sitcom on BBC
World of Sports (American radio program), the ABC radio network counterpart of the television ABC's Wide World of Sports

See also
Wide World of Sports (disambiguation)
Sportsworld (disambiguation)